Field Studies is a split EP released on Magic Bullet in 2009. The first two tracks are performed by This Will Destroy You, with the last three performed by Lymbyc Systym.

Track listing

Personnel
This Will Destroy You
 Jeremy Galindo - guitar
 Donovan Jones - bass guitar, keyboard
 Chris King - guitar
 Andrew Miller - drums

Lymbyc Systym
 Michael Bell - drums
 Jared Bell - keyboard

Additional musicians
 Mom - cello, violin (tracks 1 and 2)
 Michael Bryant - trombone (track 1)
 Warren Stewart - trumpet (track 1)
 Jeff Ziegler - guitar (track 4)
 Kevin Tangney - trumpet (track 3 and 4)
 Dylan Rieck - cello (track 4)

Production
John Congleton - producer (tracks 1 and 2), mixer and engineer (tracks 1 and 2)
This Will Destroy You - producers (track 1 and 2)
Alan Douches - mastering
Jeff Ziegler - recording (tracks 3,4 and 5)
Lymbyc Systym - recording (tracks 3,4 and 5)
Chris King - layout
Jared Bell - layout

References

External links
This Will Destroy You on MySpace
Lymbyc Systym on MySpace
Magic Bullet Records official website

Split EPs
2009 EPs
Lymbyc Systym albums
This Will Destroy You EPs
Albums produced by John Congleton